Horntveth is a surname. Notable people with the surname include:

Lars Horntveth (born 1980), Norwegian musician, band leader, and composer
Line Horntveth (born 1974), Norwegian musician, sister of Martin and Lars
Martin Horntveth (born 1977), Norwegian musician, composer, and electronica artist